An internal passport or a domestic passport is an identity document. Uses for internal passports have included restricting citizens of a subdivided state to employment in their own area (preventing their migration to richer cities or regions), clearly recording the ethnicity of citizens to enforce segregation or prevent passing, and controlling access to sensitive sites or closed cities.

When passports first emerged, there was no clear distinction between internal and international ones. Later, some countries developed sophisticated systems of passports for various purposes and various groups of population.

Summary 

Countries that currently have internal passports in the strict sense (to control internal migration) include:
  (Hukou),
  (hoju),
  (Russian internal passport)

Internal passports are known to have been issued and used previously by:
  and its successor states,
 , until 1862
 
  (for African-Americans in slave states prior to the Civil War),
  (see Soviet Union internal passport),
 ,
  (passaporto per l'interno) 
 , between 1919 and 1940, not intended for traveling; but rather acting as personal identification documents entitling the user to Lithuanian citizenship.
 , during apartheid
  (until 2016, replaced by National Card) 
  (from 1938 until 1943)
  (until 1860)
  (until 2020; new document occasionally called "passport card" but carries no restrictions on internal migration)

Terminology
In many countries, the word "passport" is only used in modern language to denote a document issued for the purpose of international travel, which is subject to discretionary permission. However, in post-Soviet countries, the word "passport" is implied to merely mean a primary identification document, especially if has the form of a booklet. Nevertheless, it is also extended by analogy to other forms of identification documents. For example, Ukrainian identity cards that are replacing old-fashioned internal passport booklets are still called паспорт (pasport, "passport").

Types

Canada

In 1885 the "pass system" was introduced in Canada, to restrict and control the movement of First Nations people within Canada. Instituted at the time of the North-West Rebellion, it remained in force for 60 years despite having no basis in law. Any First Nation person caught outside his Indian reserve without a pass issued by an Indian agent was returned to the reserve or incarcerated.

France

In France, in the past, one had to show an internal passport to change city. Former convicts who had served forced labour, even after having served their sentence, had a yellow passport, which made them outcasts. A famous holder of the yellow passport is the former  Jean Valjean the hero of the novel by Victor Hugo.

A décret issued 2 October 1795 (10 Vendémiaire year IV in the French Republican Calendar) required all persons traveling outside the limits of their canton to possess either an internal passport (for voyages within France) or external passport (for travel outside France). In 1815 an internal passport cost 2 francs and was delivered by the mayor of the commune to the residence of the passport requester. Internal passports were significantly easier to obtain than passports for foreign travel, which cost 10 francs in 1815. In the early 19th century, many emigrants obtained cheaper and easier-to-obtain internal passports to travel to the port of Havre, from which most ships to the United States departed. As control of the issuance of internal passports, which required a certificate of good behavior, was in the hands of the mayors of communes, there was some degree of favoritism in the issuance/denial of internal passports in the 18th century.

Internal passports were finally abolished in France in 1862.

Booklet and notebook of circulation of travellers

In France, the "livret de circulation" (booklet of circulation) and its variant the "carnet de circulation" (notebook of circulation) provided to those of no fixed abode were particularly constraining and discriminatory obligations imposed on itinerants.

South Africa

In South Africa, the pass laws (notably the Pass Laws Act 1952, which applied until 1986) were a component of the apartheid system.  The laws regulated where, when and for how long persons could remain outside their "homeland"—which, for many people, was not their homeland, so thousands of autochthon people were forced to change region. These laws also made it compulsory for all black South Africans over the age of 15 to carry a pass book at all times. However, the legislation also required that citizens of all races have on their person an ID book, which closely approximates a passport.

Soviet Union and its successors

The internal passport system of the Russian Empire was abandoned after the October Revolution in 1917, lifting most limitations upon internal movements of members of labouring classes in Soviet Russia. Labour booklets became the principal means of personal identification.

In 1932, the "passport regime" was reintroduced, its declared purpose to improve the registration of population and "relieve" major industrial cities and other sensitive localities of "hiding kulaks and dangerous political elements" and those "not engaged in labor of social usefulness". The "passportization" process developed gradually involving factories, large, medium, and small cities, settlements, and rural areas, and finally became universal by the mid-1970s.

Internal passports were used in the Soviet Union for identification of persons for various purposes. In particular, passports were used to control and monitor the place of residence by means of the propiska, a regulation designed to control the population's internal movement by binding a person to his or her permanent place of residence. For example, a valid propiska was necessary to receive higher education or medical treatment, although these services were not limited to the location registered. Besides marriage to a resident of another area, university education was the most popular way of circumventing one's propiska and residing elsewhere. Also, since only a minority of dwellings were privately owned, having a propiska at a certain address meant that one had the right to live there.

All residents were required by law to record their address in the document and to report any relevant changes to a local office of the Ministry of Internal Affairs.  For example, citizens needed to submit photographs of themselves for their passport, taken when they were issued the document at age 16, and again at ages 25 and 45. 

Formally, passports were not necessary for traveling per se in late Soviet Union. Bus, train, and air tickets were sold without names, and identification documents were not necessary for boarding buses and trains (and only became necessary to board a plane in the mid-1970s) except when traveling to/from border-adjacent areas and controlled cities. Nevertheless, passports were necessary for temporary propiska in a number of situations such as checking in a hotel or renting a private dwelling (no marks were placed in the document).

Moreover, in the late 1980s and early 1990s, Soviet internal passports, accompanied with a special leaflet, were valid for traveling to most Comecon countries and Yugoslavia as a member of a touristic group. The leaflet functioned as an equivalent of exit visa stamped in international passports; destination countries did not require entry visas at that time.

The Russian Federation

In 1992, passports, or other photo identification documents, became necessary to board a train. Train tickets started to bear passenger names, allegedly as an effort to combat speculative reselling of the tickets.

The dissolution of the Soviet Union invoked the need to distinguish Russian citizens among the citizens of the former Soviet Union.

On 9 December 1992, special leaves were introduced which were affixed in Soviet passports, certifying that the bearer of the passport was a citizen of Russia. These leaves were optional unless travelling to the other former Soviet republics which continued to accept Soviet passports; for other occasions, other proofs of citizenship were accepted as well. Issuance of the leaves continued until the end of 2002.

On 8 July 1997, the current design of the Russian internal passport was introduced. Unlike the Soviet passports, which had three photo pages, the new passports have one. A passport is first issued at the age of 14 and then replaced upon at the ages of 20 and 45. The text in the passports is in Russian. Passports issued in autonomous entities may, on the bearer's request, contain an additional leaf duplicating all data in one of the official local languages.

A passport exchange was begun; the deadline was initially set at end of 2001 but then prolonged several times and finally set at 30 June 2004. The government had first regulated that having failed to exchange one's passport would constitute a punishable violation. However, the Supreme Court ruled to the effect that citizens cannot be obliged to exchange their passports. The Soviet passports ceased to be valid as means of personal identification since mid-2004, but it is still legal (though barely practicable) to have one.

The propiska was formally abandoned soon after adoption of the current Constitution in 1993, and replaced with "residency registration" which, in principle, was simply notification of one's place of residence.

Nevertheless, under the new regulations, permanent registration records are stamped in citizens' internal passports just as were propiskas. That has led to the widespread misconception that registration was just a new name for the propiska; many continue to call it a "propiska". The misconception is partly reinforced by the fact that the existing rules for registration make it an onerous process, dependent on the consent of landlords, which effectively prevents tenants of flats from registering.

Unlike with the propiska, it is not an offense not to have registration unless one resides in a particular dwelling for more than 90 days. From a practical point of view, the long deadline makes it difficult to prove avoidance of residency registration and so to prosecute. De facto citizens have no restriction on where they reside (with the exception of closed cities or near borders). Still, many civil rights are dependent on registration, such as the right to vote.

In November 2010, the Federal Migration Service announced the possible cancellation of internal passports, which, if it were implemented, would be replaced by plastic ID cards or drivers' licenses. In 2013, a plastic ID card, Universal electronic card was introduced, and any citizen had the right to reject it and retain an old-style internal passport. This card system was abandoned in January 2017.

Belarus

In Belarus, internal passports and passports for travelling abroad were merged into one kind of document in 1991. Passports are the primary means of identification for citizens of Belarus both in homeland and abroad. Belarusian citizens must have a passport after they have reached the age of 14; passports can also be issued to younger children for travelling abroad. Passports are valid for 10 years regardless of age.

Apart from visa pages, a considerable number of pages in Belarusian passports are designated for "internal" records, such as place of residence and marriage. Citizens had to obtain special stamp enabling the passport bearer to cross the border of the Union State before 2005 when the Constitutional Court ruled the practice not conforming to the Constitution.

Combination of primary identification document with international passport causes significant inconvenience to bearers who cannot certify their identity while their passports are processed for visas in embassies and consulates. A passport can also be easily invalidated by a careless foreign passport control official by placing a stamp in a reserved page.

China and neighbors 
The internal passport system in China and some neighbors evolved from an ancient huji system of family register. The system has evolved to manage internal movement, distribution of welfare, and other rights.

People's Republic of China

The People's Republic of China (PRC) maintains a system of residency registration in mainland China known as hukou, by which government permission is needed to formally change one's place of residence. It is enforced with identity cards. This system effectively controlled internal migration before the 1980s, but subsequent market reforms caused it to collapse as a means of migration control. An estimated 150 to 200 million people are part of the "blind flow" and have unofficially migrated, generally from poor, rural areas to wealthy, urban ones. However, unofficial residents are often denied official services such as education and medical care and are sometimes subject to both social and political discrimination.

Korea

Vietnam

Germany
The Kennkarte was the basic identity document in use inside Germany (including occupied incorporated territories) during the Third Reich era. They were first introduced in July 1938. Due to legal arguments, the first cards were not issued until June 1941. They were normally obtained through a police precinct and bore the stamps of the corresponding issuing office and official. Every male German citizen aged 18 and older, and every Jewish citizen (both male and female) was issued one and was expected to produce it when confronted by officials. German authorities continued to issue them until 1943.

Sweden
Internal passports were abolished in Sweden in 1860.

United States of America 

Throughout the Thirteen Colonies before the Revolutionary War, slaves confined to homes or agricultural plantations, or whose movements were limited by curfews, could be required to furnish written evidence their owner had granted an exemption to permit their free movement.  For example the New Hampshire Assembly in 1714 passed "An Act To Prevent Disorders In The Night": Notices emphasizing the curfew were published in The New Hampshire Gazette in 1764 and 1771.

Internal passports were required for African Americans in the southern slave states before the American Civil War, for example, an authenticated internal passport dated 1815 was presented to Massachusetts citizen George Barker to allow him to freely travel as a free black man to visit relatives in slave states. After many of these states seceded, forming the Confederate States of America, the central Confederate government not only systematized this system but required internal passports for whites as well.

Such an internalized passport in the U.S. today would be unconstitutional under the Privileges and Immunities Clause.

See also

101st kilometre
Closed city
Hukou system
International passport
Propiska
Wolf ticket (Russia)
Real ID Act
Internally displaced person
Internal colonialism
Internal migration
Statute of Cambridge 1388
Subnational citizenship

References

Citations

Sources 
 
 Tim Lott writing on British “internal passports”
 

Identity documents
Passports
Internal migration